Robert Hampton Steele (born November 3, 1938) is a retired American politician.

Life 
Steele was born in Hartford, Connecticut. His father, known as Bob Steele, was host of the state's top rated morning show on WTIC-AM for more than fifty years.

He attended public schools in Wethersfield, Connecticut and obtained a Bachelor of Arts from Amherst College, Massachusetts in 1960. He graduated from Columbia University in 1963. Between 1968 and 1970 Steele was a securities analyst for the Travelers Insurance Company.

Steele was a Republican member of the United States House of Representatives for the Connecticut's 2nd congressional district from 1970 to 1975. He was elected simultaneously to the Ninety-first and to the Ninety-second Congresses by special election to fill the vacancy caused by the death of United States Representative William L. St. Onge.

He was re-elected to the Ninety-third Congress (November 3, 1970 - January 3, 1975) by the widest margin in the history of the 2nd District; but was not a candidate for re-election to the Ninety-fourth Congress in 1974.

In 1974 he was an unsuccessful candidate for Governor of Connecticut and is now a resident of Essex, Connecticut.

External links
Biographical Directory of the United States Congress
Robert Hampton Steele  – Brief biography on the House website

1938 births
Living people
Columbia University alumni
Politicians from Hartford, Connecticut
Amherst College alumni
Republican Party members of the United States House of Representatives from Connecticut